The 9th Alpini Regiment is a regiment of the Italian Army's mountain infantry speciality, the Alpini, which distinguished itself in combat during World War I and World War II. Based in the city of L'Aquila in Abruzzo the regiment is operationally assigned to the Alpine Brigade "Taurinense".

History

Interwar years 
The 9th Alpini Regiment was formed on 1 July 1921 in Gorizia and assigned to the 3rd Alpine Division. Initially the regiment consisted of four battalions, which had been transferred from other Alpini regiments:
 Alpini Battalion "Vicenza", in Tolmino (from the 6th Alpini Regiment)
 Alpini Battalion "Bassano", in Gorizia (from the 6th Alpini Regiment)
 Alpini Battalion "Feltre", in Caporetto (from the 7th Alpini Regiment)
 Alpini Battalion "Cividale", in Cividale del Friuli (from the 8th Alpini Regiment)

In 1926 the Feltre and Cividale returned to their original regiments and the 9th Alpini Regiment consisted of the battalions Vicenza and Bassano. On 11 March 1926 the 3rd Alpine Division was reduced to III Alpine Brigade.

On 13 April 1935 the Alpini Battalion "L'Aquila" was formed in Gorizia, drawing its personnel from the "Vicenza" and "Bassano" battalions. The new battalion was considered to be the heir of the World War I Alpini Battalion "Monte Berico", which had consisted of soldiers recruited in Abruzzo. Gabriele D'Annunzio created the battalion's motto "D'Aquila Penne, Ugne di Leonessa", which is a word pun: its literal translation is "Eagle feathers, Lioness claws", but L'Aquila, Penne, Ugne and Leonessa are Abruzzo towns, which were the recruitment basin of the Monte Berico. On 10 September 1935, the 3rd Alpine Division "Julia" was formed by renaming the III Superior Alpine Command "Julio", which was the their of the III Alpine Brigade.

On 31 October 1935 the regiment was structured as follows:

 9th Alpini Regiment
  Alpini Battalion "L'Aquila"
  93rd Alpini Company
  108th Alpini Company
  143rd Alpini Company
  292nd Alpini Company
  Alpini Battalion "Vicenza"
  59th Alpini Company
  60th Alpini Company
  61st Alpini Company
  290th Alpini Company
  Alpini Battalion "Bassano"
  62nd Alpini Company
  63rd Alpini Company
  74th Alpini Company
  297th Alpini Company

On 20 January 1936 the fourth companies of the battalions were disbanded and on 25 September 1937 the Alpini Battalion "Bassano" was transferred to the 11th Alpini Regiment.

World War II 

After the outbreak of World War II the regiment formed reserve battalions, which were named after valleys located near L'Aquila and Vicenza. At the end of the 1939 the regiment consisted of the following units:

  9th Alpini Regiment
  Alpini Battalion "L'Aquila"
  93rd Alpini Company
  108th Alpini Company
  143rd Alpini Company
  Alpini Battalion "Vicenza"
  59th Alpini Company
  60th Alpini Company
  61st Alpini Company
  Alpini Battalion "Val Leogra" ("Vicenza" reserve battalion)
  259th Alpini Company
  260th Alpini Company
  261st Alpini Company
  Alpini Battalion "Val Pescara" ("L'Aquila" reserve battalion)
  285th Alpini Company
  286th Alpini Company
  287th Alpini Company

In mid-April 1939 the 3rd Alpine Division "Julia" was sent to Albania and posted to the Albanian-Yugoslav border until September 1941, when it was moved to the Greek border for the planned Italian invasion of Greece. During the following Greco-Italian war the 9th Alpini consisted of the Vicenza and L'Aquila battalions, and was led by Colonel Gaetano Tavoni. After the German invasion of Greece and the Greek surrender the Julia returned to Italy. For its conduct during the Greco-Italian war the 9th Alpini Regiment was awarded Italy's highest military honor a Gold Medal of Military Valour.

On 15 February 1942 the regiment's depot formed support weapons companies for the two regular battalions. In July 1942 the Julia was sent with the 2nd Alpine Division "Tridentina", 4th Alpine Division "Cuneense" and other Italian units to the Soviet Union to form the Italian Army in Russia ( abbreviated as ARMIR) and fight alongside the German Wehrmacht against the Red Army. To bring the regiment to full strength for the deployment to the Soviet Union it received the Alpini Battalion "Val Cismon" from the 7th Alpini Regiment. Taking up positions along the Don River, the Italian units covered part of the left flank of the German Sixth Army, which spearheaded the German summer offensive of 1942 into the city of Stalingrad.

After successfully encircling the German Sixth army in Stalingrad the Red Army's attention turned to the Italian units along the Don. On 14 January 1943, the Soviet Operation Little Saturn began and the three alpine division found themselves quickly encircled by rapidly advancing armored Soviet Forces. The Alpini held the front on the Don, but within three days the Soviets had advanced 200 km to the left and right of the Alpini. On the evening of 17 January the commanding officer of the Italian Mountain Corps General Gabriele Nasci ordered a full retreat. At this point the Julia and Cuneense divisions were already heavily decimated and only the Tridentina was still capable of conducting combat operations. As the Soviets had already occupied every village bitter battles had to be fought to clear the way out of the encirclement. The remnants of the Tridentina were able to break the Soviet encirclement in the Battle of Nikolayevka on 26 January 1943, allowing the survivors of the Julia to reach German lines, which were reached on the morning of 28 January. By then the men of the 9th Alpini Regiment had walked 200 km, fought in 20 battles and spent 11 nights camped out in the middle of the Steppe. Temperatures during the nights were between -30 °C and -40 °C. For its conduct during the campaign in the Soviet Union the 9th Alpini Regiment was once more awarded Italy's highest military honor a Gold Medal of Military Valour.

The few survivors of the regiment were repatriated in spring 1943 and garrisoned in Udine. The L'Aquila was the worst affected battalion and returned with just three officers and 159 Alpini out more than 1,500 deployed. After the announcement of the Armistice of Cassibile on 8 September 1943, the regiment and its battalions were disbanded by invading German forces.

During the war the regiment's depot raised several additional units:

 Alpini Battalion "Vicenza Bis", raised in April 1941 and deployed for anti-partisan duties to the Isonzo valley
 IX Reserve Battalion, deployed with the Julia to the Soviet Union, where it was destroyed
 IX March Battalion, raised in late 1942 for the 8th Marching Division
 XXXIX Battalion "Monte Berico", initially raised as XXXIX Reserve Battalion for the 9th Alpini Regiment, but after the destruction of the regiment the battalion was assigned to the 167th Alpini Coastal Regiment of the 223rd Coastal Division.

In September 1944 the Italian Co-belligerent Army raised the Alpini Battalion "Abruzzi", which was soon renamed Alpini Battalion "L'Aquila" for service with the Combat Group "Legnano". The Legnano participated on the allied side in the Italian campaign until the German surrender.

Cold War 

On 15 April 1946 the Alpini Battalion "L'Aquila" was the first battalion to enter the reformed of the 8th Alpini Regiment, first based in Edolo and then in Tarvisio.

Alpini Battalion "Vicenza" 

During the 1975 Italian Army reform the 8th Alpini Regiment was disbanded and its battalions became independent. On 1 September 1975 the Alpini Battalion "Vicenza" in Tolmezzo was reformed as Alpini Battalion "Vicenza" (Recruits Training). The Vicenza received the flag and traditions of the 9th Alpini Regiment, but had to transfer the two Silver Medals of Military Valour awarded to the Alpini Battalion "L'Aquila" to that battalion's newly created flag; while the two Gold Medals of Military Valour, awarded to the 9th Alpini Regiment for its conduct during the Greco-Italian war and on the Eastern Front, were duplicated for the new flag of the L'Aquila battalion. The Silver Medal of Military Valour awarded to the Vicenza battalion for its conduct during World War I, and the Silver Medal of Military Valour awarded to the Val Leogra battalion for its conduct during the Greco-Italian war remained affixed to the flag of the Alpini Battalion Vicenza. 

For its conduct and work after the 1976 Friuli earthquake the battalion was awarded a Bronze Medal of Army Valour, which was affixed to the battalion's flag and added to the battalion's coat of arms.

With the battalions base in Tolmezzo damaged by the earthquake the battalion moved to Codroipo, with the exception of the 61st Company, which was transferred to Teramo to train the recruits of the L'Aquila Battalion.

Alpini Battalion "L'Aquila" 

During the same reform the Alpini Battalion "L'Aquila" in Tarvisio was disbanded on 31 August 1975 and the next day the Alpini Recruits Training Battalion "Julia" in L'Aquila was reformed as Alpini Battalion "L'Aquila". As the traditions and flag of the 9th Alpini Regiment had been assigned to the Alpini Battalion "Vicenza", the L'Aquila was granted a new flag on 12 November 1976 by decree 846 of the President of the Italian Republic Giovanni Leone. The two Gold Medals of Military Valour awarded to the 9th Alpini Regiment for its conduct during the Greco-Italian war and on the Eastern Front, were duplicated for the new flag of the L'Aquila, while the Silver Medal of Military Valour awarded to the L'Aquila battalion for its conduct during the allied Spring 1945 offensive in Italy and the Silver Medal of Military Valour awarded to the Monte Berico battalion for its conduct in World War I, were transferred from the flag of the 9th Alpini to the L'Aquila's flag.

The battalion recruited from the mountainous Abruzzo region and was operationally assigned to the Alpine Brigade "Julia". To support the battalion the 15th Battery of the Mountain Artillery Group "Conegliano" in Udine was detached to L'Aquila.

For its conduct and work after the 1980 Irpinia earthquake the battalion was awarded a Bronze Medal of Army Valour, which was affixed to the battalion's flag and added to the battalion's coat of arms.

Recent times 
On 4 September 1991 the Alpini Battalion "L'Aquila" entered the reformed 9th Alpini Regiment in L'Aquila. As the regiment's original flag had been assigned to the Alpini Battalion "Vicenza" the 9th Alpini continued to use the flag of the L'Aquila. On 27 August 1996 the Vicenza battalion was disbanded and the 9th Alpini Regiment received its original flag in a ceremony on 13 September 1996.

On 1 September 1997 the regiment was transferred from the Alpine Brigade "Julia" to the Alpine Brigade "Taurinense". In 2001 the regiment raised the 264th Anti-tank Company "Val Cismon", which later merged with the 119th Mortar Company to form the 119th Maneuver Support Company. On 29 May 2017 the regiment raised the Multifunctional battalion "Orta", which was renamed later in the same year "Vicenza". As of 2022 the 9th Alpini Regiment is the only Alpini regiment with two battalions.

Current structure 
The 9th Alpini Regiment is assigned to the Alpine Brigade "Taurinense" and based in the central Italian city of L'Aquila. It is the strongest regiment of the Italian Army, with the "L'Aquila" fielding four instead of the usual three infantry companies, and fielding a second battalion with transport, engineering, and support companies. As of 2022 the regiment consists of:

  Regimental Command
  Command and Logistic Support Company
  Alpini Battalion "L'Aquila"
  93rd Alpini Company
  108th Alpini Company
  119th Alpini Company
  143rd Alpini Company "La Scassata"
  119th Maneuver Support Company
  Alpini Battalion "Vicenza", multifunctional battalion with civil protection duties.
  General Support Company
  Tactical Mobility and Deployment Company
  Special Transports Company

The Command and Logistic Support Company fields the following platoons: C3 Platoon, Transport and Materiel Platoon, Medical Platoon, and Commissariat Platoon.

Equipment 
The Alpini companies are equipped with Bv 206S tracked all-terrain carriers, Puma 6x6 wheeled armored personnel carriers and Lince light multirole vehicles. The maneuver support company is equipped with 120mm mortars and Spike MR anti-tank guided missiles.

Military honors 
After World War II the President of Italy awarded the 9th Alpini Regiment twice Italy's highest military honor, the Gold Medal of Military Valour, for the regiment's conduct and sacrifice during the Greco-Italian War and Italian campaign on the Eastern Front:

  Greco-Italian War, awarded 30 January 1948
  Italian campaign on the Eastern Front, awarded 31 December 1947

Commanders 
As regiment the 9th Alpini has always been commanded by a Colonel.

1921-1943 
From 1921 to 1943, the 9th Regiment had 11 Commanders:

 Col. Remigio Peretti (1 July 1921 – 17 June 1927);
 Col. Ferruccio Pisoni (18 June 1927 – 31 March 1929);
 Col. Gustavo Pesenti (1 April 1929 – 31 January 1933);
 Col. Mario Girotti (1 February 1933 – 18 October 1934);
 Col. Giuseppe Corrado (19 October 1934 – 15 October 1935);
 Col. Luigi Chatrian (16 October 1935 – 1 October 1937);
 Col. Gaetano Tavoni (2 October 1937 – 8 January 1941);
 Col. Achille Billia (9 January 1941 – 5 August 1941);
 Col. Umberto Manfredini (6 August 1941 – 31 May 1942);
 Col. Fausto Lavizzari (1 June 1942 – 21 January 1943);
 Col. Gerardo Sibille Sizia (22 January 1943 – 9 September 1943).

1991-present 

Since 1991, the 9th Regiment has had 17 Commanders:

 Col. Gianfranco Marinelli (4 September 1991 – 20 August 1993);
 Col. Armando Monaco (21 August 1993 – 28 September 1995);
 Col. Pierluigi Campregher (29 September 1995 – 19 September 1996);
 Col. Giovanni Di Federico (13 September 1996 – 25 September 1998);
 Col. Oliviero Finocchio (25 September 1998 – 10 September 1999);
 Col. Paolo Serra (11 September 1999 – 2 July 2000);
 Col. Antonio Di Vita (3 July 2000 – 7 November 2002);
 Col. Claudio Berto (8 November 2002 – 26 February 2004);
 Col. Edmondo Panajoli (27 February 2004 – 15 September 2005);
 Col. Michele Pellegrino (16 September 2005 – 25 August 2007);
 Col. Andrea Mulciri (25 August 2007 – 1 October 2009);
 Col. Franco Federici (1 October 2009 – 25 November 2010);
 Col. Fabio Asso (25 November 2010 – 23 September 2011);
 Col. Riccardo Cristoni (23 September 2011 – 13 September 2013);
 Col. Massimo Iacobucci (13 September 2013 – 24 July 2015);
 Col. Antonio Sedia (24 July 2015 – 23 September 2016);
 Col. Marco Iovinelli (current commander, since 23 September 2016).

Operational history 
The 9th Alpini Regiment has a long operational history:
 Balkans campaign;
 Russian campaign;
 Italian campaign;
 1976: Friuli earthquake rescue operations;
 1980: Irpinia earthquake rescue operations;
 1993: UNOMOZ;
 1997: Umbria and Marche earthquake rescue operations;
 1997: Operation Alba;
 2000: Kosovo Force;
 2001- onwards: Operazione Domino;
 2007-2013: Afghanistan (Khost, Kabul and Farah, more deployments);
 2015: UNIFIL.

External links 
 Official Homepage
 9th Alpini Regiment on vecio.it

Source 
 Franco dell'Uomo, Rodolfo Puletti: L'Esercito Italiano verso il 2000 - Volume Primo - Tomo I, Rome 1998, Stato Maggiore dell'Esercito - Ufficio Storico, pages: 494-497 (L'Aquila Battalion) & 515-518 (Vicenza Battalion)

References 

Alpini regiments of Italy
Regiments of Italy in World War I
Regiments of Italy in World War II
Military units and formations established in 1921
Military units and formations disestablished in 1943
Military units and formations established in 1991
1921 establishments in Italy